Michael Robert Elmslie Fitchett (born 20 September 1982) is a New Zealand former professional basketball player. He attended Nelson College from 1996 to 2000, where he excelled as a sportsman. He was the school's junior athletics champion in 1996 and 1997, played for the 'A' basketball team from 1996 to 2000, and was a member of the 1st XI cricket team from 1996 to 2000. He played in the New Zealand NBL every year between 1999 and 2012. He also played one game in the Australian NBL with the New Zealand Breakers in January 2009. He also represented the Tall Blacks multiple times between 2008 and 2011.

In October 2018, Fitchett was appointed head coach of the Nelson Giants for the 2019 season. He was elevated to dual general manager / head coach of the Giants in 2021. He continued in the role in 2022 and won the New Zealand NBL Coach of the Year Award.

Between 2016 and 2019, Fitchett served as an assistant coach with the New Zealand Breakers.

References

External links
Michael Fitchett at basketball.org.nz
Michael Fitchett at australiabasket.com
Breakers set to announce Michael Fitchett as new assistant coach
Basketball: Fitchett keen to drain his shots at redemption
Putting The Fit In Fit-chett

1982 births
Living people
Nelson Giants players
New Zealand Breakers players
New Zealand men's basketball players
Otago Nuggets players
Nelson Giants coaches
People educated at Nelson College
Point guards
Waikato Pistons players
2010 FIBA World Championship players
New Zealand basketball coaches